Brenntag SE is a German chemical distribution company founded in 1874 in Berlin. The company is headquartered in Essen, Germany and has operations in more than 78 countries worldwide.

History
In 1874 Philipp Mühsam founded an egg wholesale business in Berlin which would later become Brenntag. In 1912 Brenntag entered the chemical distribution business.

From the first expansion beyond Germany in 1966 through its entry into the U.S. market in the early 1970s and accelerated growth worldwide throughout the past two decades, much of the growth of Brenntag has been enabled by selective acquisitions in key growth areas around the world. 

In the 1980s, the company continued to expand in the USA through acquisitions of several distribution companies. In the following decade Brenntag expanded within Europe through acquisitions and joint ventures. By acquiring Holland Chemical International, then the fifth largest chemical distributor worldwide, in 2000 Brenntag gained market shares in Scandinavia, Eastern Europe, and the USA and became a market leader in Latin America. In the following ten years the company acquired companies worldwide and therewith expanded its network and market shares. At the same time new chemical distribution centers were built at strategic locations.

The most recent milestone acquisition was the purchase in late 2008 of the distribution business of Rhodia, giving Brenntag the first distribution presence in the Asia Pacific region. In 2010 and 2011 Brenntag further expanded its market presence in the region significantly by acquiring EAC Industrial Ingredients Ltd. A/S and Zhong Yung (International) Chemical Ltd.

Since 29 March 2010, Brenntag AG (WKN A1DAHH) is listed at the German Stock Exchange in the Prime Standard Segment, since 21 June 2010 as a member of the MDAX index. Since September 20 2021, Brenntag is a member of the DAX index.

In 2019 a number of criminal charges were raised against the company for export chemical components to Syria that were subject to export controls due to Syria's usage of chemical weapons.

Body of the company 
Management Board 
 Christian Kohlpaintner (CEO)
 Kristin Neumann
 Henri Nejade
 Steven Terwindt
 Ewout van Jarwaarde

Supervisory Board 
 Doreen Nowotne (Chairwoman)

Shareholder structure
Current shareholder structure (end Dec 2019):
 Free float: 100.0%

References

External links 
 
e-commerce website
 
 

Companies established in 1874
Companies based in Essen
1874 establishments in Germany
Companies listed on the Frankfurt Stock Exchange